Cupcake Wars is an American reality competition series which premiered on August 7, 2009 on cable television network Food Network. The show is hosted by Justin Willman and based on creating unique and professional-style cupcakes. The show is similar to successful Chopped cooking show aired on the same network, in that it starts with four contestants who are eliminated one-by-one in three rounds, with the winning team receiving $10,000 and the opportunity to be featured in an upcoming event. Each team consists of a chef and a sous-chef.

Series overview

Episodes

Season 1 (2009–10)

Season 2 (2010–11)

Season 3 (2011)

Season 4 (2011–12)

Season 5 (2012)

Season 6 (2012)

Season 7 (2012–13)

Season 8 (2013)

Season 9 (2013)

Season 10 (2016)

References

External links
 Cupcake Wars on Food Network
 Cupcake Wars on IMDb

Lists of American non-fiction television series episodes